Júnior César Eduardo Machado or simply Júnior César (born April 9, 1982 in Magé), is a Brazilian left back. He is currently a free agent.

Career
Júnior César started his career at Fluminense, he subsequently played for Santos Laguna, Botafogo, São Paulo, Flamengo and Atlético Mineiro.

Career statistics
(Correct )

according to combined sources on the Flamengo official website and Flaestatística.

Honours
Fluminense
Rio de Janeiro State League: 2002, 2006
Copa do Brasil: 2007

Atlético Mineiro
Campeonato Mineiro: 2013
Copa Libertadores: 2013

References

External links
Guardian Stats Centre
Futpédia 

1982 births
Living people
Brazilian footballers
Fluminense FC players
Santos Laguna footballers
Botafogo de Futebol e Regatas players
São Paulo FC players
CR Flamengo footballers
Clube Atlético Mineiro players
Campeonato Brasileiro Série A players
Liga MX players
Brazilian expatriate footballers
Expatriate footballers in Mexico
Association football defenders
Sportspeople from Rio de Janeiro (state)
People from Magé